|}

The Dr P. J. Moriarty Novice Chase, currently known for sponsorship purposes as the Ladbrokes Novice Chase, is a Grade 1 National Hunt steeplechase in Ireland which is open to horses aged five years or older. It is run at Leopardstown over a distance of about 2 miles and 5 furlongs (4,225 metres), and during its running there are fourteen fences to be jumped. The race is for novice chasers, and it is scheduled to take place each year in February.

The first version of the race was established in 1989, and during its early years the event was known by various titles. The name of Dr P. J. Moriarty Novice Chase (initially including the word "Memorial") was introduced in 1998, at which time the race was classed at Grade 2 level. It was promoted to Grade 1 status in 2002. Since 2015 the race has been sponsored by Flogas Ireland Ltd and run for the Dr P. J. Moriarty Trophy.

Winners of the event sometimes go on to compete in the Brown Advisory Novices' Chase in March. Four horses have achieved victory in both races – Florida Pearl (1998), Cooldine (2009), Bostons Angel (2011) and Monkfish (2021).

The Willie Mullins-trained Faugheen became the oldest winner of the race in 2020, and went on to finish third in the Marsh Novices' Chase at the 2020 Cheltenham Festival

Records
Leading jockey since 1989 (5 wins):
 Paul Townend – Citizen Vic (2010), Boston Bob (2012), Faugheen (2020), Monkfish (2021), Galopin Des Champs (2022)

Leading trainer since 1989 (10 wins):
 Willie Mullins –  Florida Pearl (1998), J'y Vole (2008), Cooldine (2009), Citizen Vic (2010), Boston Bob (2013), Ballycasey (2014), Outlander (2016), Faugheen (2020), Monkfish (2021), Galopin Des Champs (2022)

Winners
 Amateur jockeys indicated by "Mr".

See also
 List of Irish National Hunt races

References

 Racing Post:

 pedigreequery.com – Dr P. J. Moriarty Novice Chase – Leopardstown.

National Hunt races in Ireland
National Hunt chases
Leopardstown Racecourse